The Royalty Theatre, Glasgow (later the Lyric Theatre) was a theatre in Glasgow at the corner of Sauchiehall Street and Renfield Street. It was built in 1879 as part of a development by the Central Halls Company chaired by David Rattray, and was one of the first theatre designs of Frank Matcham.  In 1895 it was one of the four theatres brought together by Baillie Michael Simons of Glasgow in a new company Howard & Wyndham Ltd. The Royalty staged plays, opera, and musical comedy and later became home to repertory theatre until it became the Lyric Theatre in 1914 when it was sold to the YMCA. It was rebuilt after a fire in 1953 but was demolished in 1959, and replaced by St. Andrew House, a large concrete office block, which is now a hotel.

External links
Royalty Theatre, Arthur Lloyd
Still of building, Virtual Mitchell
Sauchiehall Street, Glasgow History

References

Theatres in Glasgow
1879 establishments in Scotland
Buildings and structures demolished in 1959
Former theatres in Scotland
Theatres completed in 1879